Zhitnikov is a surname. Notable people with the surname include:

 Aleksei Zhitnikov (born 1984), Russian footballer
 Dmitry Zhitnikov (born 1989), Russian handball player

Russian-language surnames